Chris Wong may refer to:

Chris Wong (skier) (born 1981), Canadian freestyle skier
Fresh Kid Ice (1964–2017), stage name of Chris Wong Won of 2 Live Crew
A placeholder name used in English language papers of the Hong Kong Diploma of Secondary Education and its predecessor public examinations